Marcel Trudel  (May 29, 1917 – January 11, 2011) was a Canadian historian, university professor (1947–1982) and author who published more than 40 books on the history of New France.  He brought academic rigour to an area that had been marked by nationalistic and religious biases.  His work was part of the marked changes to Quebec society during the Quiet Revolution.  Trudel's work has been honoured with major awards, including the Governor General's Literary Award for French Non-Fiction in 1966, and a second nomination for the award in 1987.

Early life and education

Marcel Trudel was born in Saint-Narcisse-de-Champlain, Quebec, northeast of Trois-Rivières, the son of Hermyle Trudel and Antoinette Cossette, the ninth of eleven children.  Orphaned at the age of five, he was adopted by a local couple in his extended family, Théodore Baril and Mary Trépanier.

He showed great academic progress and spent some months at a seminary at Trois-Rivières, but concluded that the priesthood was not for him. Rather, he had a particular interest in literature and hoped to make his living as a writer.  He earned a licence ès lettres (cum laude) in 1941 and a Doctorat ès lettres (magna cum laude) in 1945, both from Université Laval. He then had two years of post-doctoral studies at Harvard University before returning to Laval to teach history.

Career
In 1947, Trudel was the first professor of history in Laval's newly founded Institute of History. He went on to become head of the History department. From 1955 to 1960, he published on many subjects that the Catholic hierarchy controlling the university found scandalous, such as: "Chiniquy" (the first French Catholic priest who became a Presbyterian minister), "The Canadian Catholic Church under the English Military Government, in 1759-1764", and "The Slaves in New France" (most of them being Amerindian and belonging even to the Catholic Church masters). As of 1962, Trudel was also president of the For Laïcité Movement in Quebec City. It was too much: in 1962, under pressure from the Roman Catholic Church, Laval University demoted him from his position as head of the History department.

In 1961, Laval University Press joined with the University of Toronto Press in establishing the Dictionary of Canadian Biography (DCB). Trudel served as the Associate General Editor from 1961 to 1965, working with the General Editor, George Williams Brown, a historian at the University of Toronto. They collaborated both in organizing the over-all project, which has published 15 volumes and is on-going, and in editing the first volume, which covered the period from 1000 to 1700 and was published in 1966. The DCB is published simultaneously in English and French and has been widely recognized as one of the most important scholarly undertakings in Canada.

In 1965, Trudel left Laval University and Quebec City to live near Ottawa and taught at Carleton University. The next year, he began teaching at the University of Ottawa after the Ontario government took over the university from the Catholic Oblate Fathers. Having reached age 65 in 1982, he was relieved of his lecturing duties, but he continued to write from his home near Montreal until the year he died; half of his books were published in retirement. In 1993, he also began lecturing at a university to seniors' groups.

Trudel's life's work was the history of New France, in particular his monumental and authoritative Histoire de la Nouvelle-France. Planned to be ten volumes in collaboration with another Quebec historian, Guy Frégault, Trudel wrote six volumes in the series, published between 1963 and 1999. Trudel meticulously reviewed the primary sources and criticized previous accounts in his effort to tell the colony's story without what he viewed as pious or nationalist bias.

Family and death 
In 1942, Trudel married Anne Chrétien, with whom he had three children.  He married again in 1970, to Micheline D'Allaire, who was also a professor of history at the University of Ottawa.

Trudel died at the age of 93 on January 11, 2011, of generalized cancer. He left his three children, plus six grandchildren and six great-grandchildren.

Selected Honours
 1964: J.B. Tyrrell Historical Medal by the Royal Society of Canada
 1966: Governor General's Literary Award for French Non-Fiction
 1966: Ludger-Duvernay Prize by the Saint-Jean-Baptiste Society
 1971: Officer of the Order of Canada
 1984: Sir John A. Macdonald Prize by the Canadian Historical Association / Société historique du Canada
 1985: Knight of the National Order of Quebec
 2001: Prix Léon-Gérin
 2004: Grand Officer of the National Order of Quebec
 2008: Companion of the Order of Canada

Works and publications

Trudel was a prolific author.  He worked primarily in French, but some of his works also appeared in English, via translation.

Works in French

1946-1949
 1945: L'influence de Voltaire au Canada, Montréal, Fides
 1946: Vézine : a novel, Montréal, Fides
 1948: Collection de cartes anciennes et modernes pour servir à l'étude de l’histoire de l’Amérique et du Canada, Québec, Institut d'histoire et de géographie de l'Université Laval
 1949: Louis XVI, le Congrès américain et le Canada, 1774-1789, Québec, Éditions du Quartier Latin

1950-1959
 1950: Lettres du Bas-Canada, Montréal, L'Immaculée-Conception
 1952: Le Canada et la révolution américaine 1774-1789, Québec, Presses Universitaires Laval
 1952: Histoire du Canada par les textes (with Guy Frégault and Michel Brunet), Montréal ; Paris, Fides
 1952: Le régime militaire dans le gouvernement des Trois-Rivières, 1760-1764, Trois-Rivières, Éditions du bien public
 1953: L'Affaire Jumonville, Québec, Presses Universitaires Laval
 1954: Le Séminaire de Québec sous le régime militaire, 1759-1764, Québec : [s.n.]
 1955: Chiniquy, Trois-Rivières Éditions du Bien public
 1956:  Champlain, Montréal, Fides, collection « Classiques canadiens », revised edition, 1968
 1956: Les communautés de femmes sous le régime militaire, 1759-1764, Montréal, Institut d'histoire de l'Amérique française, collection Les études
 1956: Le régime seigneurial / The Seigneurial Regime, Ottawa, Société historique du Canada / Canadian Historical Association (published bilingually), revised edition, 1971
 1956-1957: L'Église canadienne sous le Régime militaire, 1759-1764, Montréal, Institut d'histoire de l'Amérique française, collection Les études, Volume I : Les problèmes, 1956; Volume II : Les institutions, 1957

1960-1969
 1960: L'esclavage au Canada français ; histoire et conditions de l'esclavage, Québec, Presses universitaires Laval
 1960: L'esclavage au Canada français, Montréal, Éditions de l'Horizon (abridged edition)
 1961: Atlas historique du Canada français des origines à 1867, Québec, Presses de l'Université Laval
 1963 to 1999:  Histoire de la Nouvelle-France, Montréal, Fides :
 Volume I : Les Vaines Tentatives, 1524-1603, 1963
 Volume II : Le Comptoir, 1604-1627, 1966 (Winner of Governor General's Literary Award for French Non-Fiction, 1966)
 Volume III : La seigneurie des Cent-Associés, 1627-1663 :
 Book I : Les évènements,  1979
 Book II : La société, 1983 (Winner of Sir John A. Macdonald Prize, 1984)
 Volume X : Le régime militaire et la disparition de la Nouvelle-France, 1759-1964, Montréal, Fides, 1999
 1965: Histoire du Canada par les textes (with Guy Frégault and Michel Brunet) : tome 1 : (1534-1854), Montréal, Fides
 1966:  Dictionnaire biographique du Canada. Volume premier, de l'an 1000 à 1700 (Associate General Editor), Québec, Presses de l'Université Laval
 1968: Jacques Cartier, Montréal, Fides
 1969: L'histoire du Canada ; enquête sur les manuels (with Genevieve Jain), within Studies of the Royal Commission on Bilingualism and Biculturalism, Queen's Printer for Canada, 150 pages

1970-1979
 1971:  Initiation à la Nouvelle-France : histoire et institutions, Montréal, Éditions HRW
 1972: Le Québec de 1663, Québec, Société historique de Québec
 1973:  Atlas de la Nouvelle-France, Québec, Presses de l'Université Laval
 1973: La Population du Canada en 1663, Montréal, Fides
 1973: Le Terrier du Saint-Laurent en 1663, Ottawa, Éditions de l'Université d'Ottawa
 1974: Les débuts du régime seigneurial au Canada, Montréal, Fides
 1976: La Révolution américaine : pourquoi la France refuse le Canada, 1775-1783, Sillery, Boréal Express, 292 pages 
 1976: Montréal : la formation d'une société, 1642-1663, Montréal, Fides
 1978: La carte de Champlain en 1632 : ses sources et son originalité, [s.l.s.n.]

1980-1989
 1983: Catalogue des immigrants, 1632-1662, Montréal, Hurtubise HMH, 570 pages 
 Mémoires d'un autre siècle, Montréal, Boréal, 320 pages  (nominated for the 1987 Governor General's Literary Award, French Non-fiction)

1990-1993
 1994:  Dictionnaire des esclaves et de leurs propriétaires au Canada français, LaSalle, Hurtubise HMH, collection Cahiers du Québec : Histoire, 1994, 520 pages 
 1995: La Population du Canada en 1666 : recensement reconstitué, Sillery, Septentrion
 1995: La Présence des noirs dans la société québécoise d'hier et d’aujourd'hui, Montréal Ministère des affaires internationales, de l'immigration et des communautés culturelles
 1997: La Seigneurie de la Compagnie des Indes occidentales, 1663-1674, Saint-Laurent, Fides
 1998: Le Terrier du Saint-Laurent en 1674, Montréal, Éditions du Méridien
 1999: Les écolières des Ursulines de Québec, 1639-1686 : Amérindiennes et Canadiennes, Montréal, Hurtubise-HMH, collection Cahiers du Québec : Histoire, 440 pages

2000-2005
 2001:  Chiniquy : prêtre catholique, ministre presbytérien, Montréal, Lidec
 2001: Saint-Narcisse-de-Champlain : au pays de la Batiscan, Saint-Narcisse, Mairie de Saint-Narcisse
 2001-2003: Les mythes et la réalité de notre histoire du Québec, Saint-Laurent, Éditions du Club Québec loisirs
 2001-2010: Mythes et réalités dans l'histoire du Québec, Montréal, Hurtubise HMH, collection Cahiers du Québec : Histoire :
 Book I : 2001, 312 p., 14,61 x 22,86 cm 
 Book II : 2004, 264 p. 
 Book III : 2006, 208 p. 
 Book IV : 2009, 192 p. 
 Book V : 2010, 200 p.  
 2003: La Nouvelle-France par les textes : les cadres de vie, Montréal, Hurtubise HMH, collection Cahiers du Québec : Histoire, 440 pages 
 2004:  Deux siècles d'esclavage au Québec, Montréal, Hurtubise HMH, 408 pages ;  updated 2009, by Micheline D'Allaire, including Dictionnaire des esclaves on CD-ROM, Bibliothèque québécoise
 2005:  Connaître pour le plaisir de connaître : entretien avec l'historien Marcel Trudel sur la science historique et le métier d'historien au Québec (with Mathieu d'Avignon), Québec, Presses de l'Université Laval

Works in English 
 1954: "The Jumonville Affair", Pennsylvania History Quarterly Journal (1953), vol. 21, no. 4, 34 pages (originally published in French)
 1956: The Seigneurial Regime / Le régime seigneurial, Ottawa, Canadian Historical Association / Société historique du Canada (published bilingually), revised edition, 1971
 1967: Canada: Unity and Diversity (with P.G. Cornell, J. Hamelin, F. Ouellet), Holt, Rinehart and Winston, Toronto, 530 pages.
 1968: Introduction to New France, Holt, Rinehart and Winston of Canada, 300 pages (condensed from the first volumes of Histoire de la Nouvelle-France)
 1970: Canadian History Textbooks - A Comparative Study (with Genevieve Jain), within Studies of the Royal Commission on Bilingualism and Biculturalism, Queen's Printer for Canada, 150 pages
 1973: The Beginnings of New France 1524-1663 (translated by Patricia Claxton), McClelland & Stewart, Toronto, 324 pages,  (Volume II of the Canadian Centenary Series)
 2002: Memoirs of a Less Travelled Road: A Historian's Life, translation by Jane Brierley of his autobiography Mémoire d'un autre siècle, Véhicule Press, 248 pages  (winner of the 2003 Governor General's Awards for French-to-English translation)
 2013: Canada's Forgotten Slaves: Two Hundred Years of Bondage, translation by George Tombs of Deux siècles d'esclavage au Québec, Véhicule Press,

See also 
Marcel Trudel - French language article on Wikipédia français

References

External links
Marcel Trudel website:  Home Page
 Quebec historian put the facts before the church-approved version of the past, The Globe and Mail obituary, Feb. 3, 2011
 Nele Sawallisch: Trudel’s Legacies:  For a Critical Understanding of Slavery in Quebec, Zeitschrift für Kanada-Studien, Wißner, Augsburg 2016  pp 86 – 101

1917 births
2011 deaths
Deaths from cancer in Quebec
Harvard University alumni
20th-century Canadian historians
Canadian male non-fiction writers
Historians of Colonial North America
Canadian writers in French
Companions of the Order of Canada
Governor General's Award-winning non-fiction writers
Grand Officers of the National Order of Quebec
Academics in Quebec
Historians from Quebec
Université Laval alumni
People from Mauricie
Academic staff of Université Laval
Presidents of the Canadian Historical Association
21st-century Canadian historians